Tunbridge Wells Grammar School for Boys (TWGSB) is a grammar school in Royal Tunbridge Wells, Kent, England.

Founded as a technical school in 1956, TWGSB became a grammar school in 1982.

The current enrolment of 1,504 pupils (of which 326 are in the sixth form) is spread across two sites: the main site in Tunbridge Wells and the annexe in Sevenoaks. The lower school is all boys (aged 11–16 years) whilst the sixth form is mixed (aged 16–18 years).

Admission to the lower school is selective with pupils required to pass the eleven-plus selection test administered by Kent County Council. Successful pupils fall within the top 25 per cent of the ability range upon entrance.

The current Headteacher, Amanda Simpson, was appointed in September 2017. Preceded by Simon Marsh (Acting Headteacher, January 2017 - August 2017), John Harrison (September 2006 - December 2016), and Derek Barnard (September 1988 - August 2006).

Academic
TWGSB offers a broad range of subjects at both GCSE and A-Level. The vast majority of boys remain at the school after completing their GCSEs in order to undertake A-Levels.

In September 2007, TWGSB became a humanities college and received: (a) a one-off sum towards a capital project, (b) recurring funding towards developments, and (c) recurring funding towards community developments.

The most recent OFSTED Report, dated November 2021, assessed the school's overall effectiveness as "Good".

School identity
The school's Latin motto, Faber est quisque suæ fortunæ, means 'Every man is the maker of his own fortune'.

All pupils are assigned a house upon entering the school. The four houses, named after local stately homes and castles, are: Ightham (Red), Knole (Yellow), Hever (Green), and Scotney (Blue).

The houses compete throughout the year for the House Cup (awarded to the house with the highest number of house points) and the Sports Cup (awarded to the house that wins sports day).

The school's prefect system delegates the enforcement of rules of conduct to Sixth Formers.

Facilities
As part of a £7.5 million expansion project, TWGSB embarked on a significant redevelopment. At the Tunbridge Wells site, new buildings and improvements include:
 A two-storey teaching centre for maths, ICT, and food tech.
 A purpose-built Sixth Form Centre.
 A reconfigured Main Building with expanded dining hall.
 A six-court Sports Centre
The school also has its own cricket, rugby, football and softball pitches and a new 3G pitch. In addition to the above, TWGSB also opened an annexe in Sevenoaks

Extracurricular activities
TWGSB offers a large range of clubs and societies (including sports, drama, and music), and also has a school orchestra and jazz band.

The school's magazine, 'Eclectics', is published annually.

TWGSB competes in several sports and runs a number of teams.

There are two student councils: the School Council and the Sixth Form Council.

Notable former pupils
 Rt. Hon. Nick Brown, MP for Newcastle East
 Oliver Chris, actor, The Office
 Dr Brian Coppins, botanist and lichenologist
 Martin Corry, England rugby captain and Leicester Tiger
 Luke Howell, professional footballer with Lincoln City F.C.
Joe Wilkinson, comedian

See also
 Tunbridge Wells Girls' Grammar School 
 The Skinners' School
 St Gregory's Catholic School

References

External links
 
 Alumni
 Ofsted site

Grammar schools in Kent
Boys' schools in Kent
Schools in Royal Tunbridge Wells
Educational institutions established in 1956
1956 establishments in England
Community schools in Kent